Potsdam is the capital and, with around 183,000 inhabitants, largest city of the German state of Brandenburg. It is part of the Berlin/Brandenburg Metropolitan Region. Potsdam sits on the River Havel, a tributary of the Elbe, downstream of Berlin, and lies embedded in a hilly morainic landscape dotted with many lakes, around 20 of which are located within Potsdam's city limits. The name of the city and of many of its boroughs are of Slavic origin.

Potsdam was a residence of the Prussian kings and the German Kaiser until 1918. Its planning embodied ideas of the Age of Enlightenment: through a careful balance of architecture and landscape, Potsdam was intended as "a picturesque, pastoral dream" which would remind its residents of their relationship with nature and reason.

The city, which is over 1000 years old, is widely known for its palaces, its lakes, and its overall historical and cultural significance. Landmarks include the parks and palaces of Sanssouci, Germany's largest World Heritage Site, as well as other palaces such as the Orangery Palace, the New Palace, Cecilienhof Palace, and Charlottenhof Palace. Potsdam was also the location of the significant Potsdam Conference in 1945, the conference where the three heads of government of the USSR, the US, and the UK decided on the division of Germany following its surrender, a conference which defined Germany's history for the following 45 years.

Babelsberg, in the south-eastern part of Potsdam, was already by the 1930s the home of a major film production studio and it has enjoyed success as an important center of European film production since the fall of the Berlin Wall. The Filmstudio Babelsberg, founded in 1912, is the oldest large-scale film studio in the world.

Potsdam developed into a centre of science in Germany in the 19th century. Today, there are three public colleges, the University of Potsdam, and more than 30 research institutes in the city.

Geography 

The area was formed from a series of large moraines left after the last glacial period. Today, only one quarter of the city is built up, the rest remaining as green space.

There are about 20 lakes and rivers in and around Potsdam, such as the Havel, the Griebnitzsee, Templiner See, Tiefer See, Jungfernsee, Teltowkanal, Heiliger See, and Sacrower See.

Subdivisions
Potsdam is divided into seven historic city Stadtteile (quarters) and nine new Ortsteile (suburbs/wards, former separate villages), which joined the city in 2003. The appearance of the city boroughs is quite different. Those in the north and in the centre consist mainly of historical buildings, the south of the city is dominated by larger areas of newer buildings.

The city of Potsdam is divided into 32 Stadtteile (boroughs, both quarters and suburbs/wards together), which are divided further into 84 statistical Bezirke (districts).

Today, one distinguishes between the older parts of the city (areas of the historic city and places suburbanized at the latest in 1939) – these are the city center, the western and northern suburbs, Bornim, Bornstedt, Nedlitz, Potsdam South, Babelsberg, Drewitz, Stern and Kirchsteigfeld – and those communities incorporated after 1990 which have since 2003 become Otsteile – these are Eiche, Fahrland, Golm, Groß Glienicke, Grube, Marquardt, Neu Fahrland, Satzkorn and Uetz-Paaren. The new Ortsteile are located mainly in the north of the city. For the history of all incorporations, see the relevant section on incorporation and spin-offs.

Structure with statistical numbering:

 1 Potsdam Nord
 11 Bornim
 12 Nedlitz
 13 Bornstedt
 14 Sacrow
 15 Eiche
 16 Grube
 17 Golm
 2 Nördliche Vorstädte
 21 Nauener Vorstadt
 22 Jägervorstadt
 23 Berliner Vorstadt
 3 Westliche Vorstädte
 31 Brandenburger Vorstadt
 32 Potsdam West
 4 Innenstadt
 41 Historische Innenstadt
 43 Zentrum Ost und Nuthepark
 44 Hauptbahnhof und Brauhausberg Nord
 5 Babelsberg
 51 Klein Glienicke
 52 Babelsberg Nord
 53 Babelsberg Süd
 6 Potsdam Süd
 61 Templiner Vorstadt
 62 Teltower Vorstadt
 63 Schlaatz
 64 Waldstadt I und Industriegelände
 65 Waldstadt II
 7 Potsdam Südost
 71 Stern
 72 Drewitz
 73 Kirchsteigfeld
 8 Nördliche Ortsteile
 81 Uetz-Paaren
 82 Marquardt
 83 Satzkorn
 84 Fahrland
 85 Neu Fahrland
 86 Groß Glienicke

At the end of 2019, a change was made to the administrative structure:
 Borough 41 has been renamed: previously Nördliche Innenstadt, now Historische Innenstadt.
 Borough 42 (Südliche Innenstadt) has been divided into two boroughs, 43 (Zentrum Ost und Nuthepark) and 44 (Hauptbahnhof und Brauhausberg Nord). The number 42 was thus repealed.
 Some very sparsely populated urban boroughs have been disbanded:
 Borough 33 (Wildpark) was incorporated into borough 32 (Potsdam-West).
 Borough 66 (Industriegelände) was incorporated into borough 64 (formerly Waldstadt I). The borough was then renamed Waldstadt I und Industriegelände.
 Borough 67 (Forst Potsdam Süd) was incorporated into borough 61 (Templiner Vorstadt).

Climate 
Officially the climate is oceanic - more degraded by being far from the coast and to the east (Köppen: Cfb), but using the 1961-1990 normal and the 0 °C isotherm the city has a humid continental climate (Dfb), which also shows a slight influence of the continent different from the climates predominantly influenced by the Atlantic Ocean. Low averages below freezing for almost all winter causing snows that are frequent and winters are cold, but not as stringent as inland locations or with greater influence from the same. Summer is also relatively warm with temperatures between 23 and 24 °C, the heat waves being influenced by the UHI of Potsdam.

Snow is common in the winter. Spring and autumn are short.

Etymology
The name "Potsdam" originally seems to have been Poztupimi. A common theory is that it derives from an old West Slavonic term meaning "beneath the oaks", i.e., the corrupted pod dubmi/dubimi (pod "beneath", dub "oak"). However, some question this explanation.

History

Pre- and early history

The area around Potsdam shows signs of occupancy since the Bronze Age and was part of Magna Germania as described by Tacitus. After the great migrations of the Germanic peoples, Slavs moved in and Potsdam was probably founded after the 7th century as a settlement of the Hevelli tribe centred on a castle. It was first mentioned in a document in 993 as Poztupimi, when Emperor Otto III gifted the territory to the Quedlinburg Abbey, then led by his aunt Matilda. By 1317, it was mentioned as a small town. It gained its town charter in 1345. In 1573, it was still a small market town of 2,000 inhabitants.

Early modern era
Potsdam lost nearly half of its population due to the Thirty Years' War (1618–1648).

A continuous Hohenzollern possession since 1415, Potsdam became prominent, when it was chosen in 1660 as the hunting residence of Frederick William I, Elector of Brandenburg, the core of the powerful state that later became the Kingdom of Prussia. It also housed Prussian barracks.

After the Edict of Potsdam in 1685, Potsdam became a centre of European immigration. Its religious freedom attracted people from France (Huguenots), Russia, the Netherlands and Bohemia. The edict accelerated population growth and economic recovery.

Later, the city became a full residence of the Prussian royal family. The buildings of the royal residences were built mainly during the reign of Frederick the Great. One of these is the Sanssouci Palace (French: "without cares", by Georg Wenzeslaus von Knobelsdorff, 1744), famed for its formal gardens and Rococo interiors. Other royal residences include the New Palace and the Orangery.

In 1815, at the formation of the Province of Brandenburg, Potsdam became the provincial capital until 1918, except for a period between 1827 and 1843 when Berlin was the provincial capital (as it became once again after 1918). The province comprised two governorates named after their capitals Potsdam and Frankfurt (Oder).

Governorate of Potsdam

The Regierungsbezirk encompassed the former districts of Uckermark, the Mark of Priegnitz, and the greater part of the Middle March. It was situated between Mecklenburg and the Province of Pomerania on the north, and the Province of Saxony on the south and west (Berlin, with a small surrounding district, was an urban governorate and enclave within the governorate of Potsdam between 1815 and 1822, then it merged as urban district into the governorate only to be disentangled again from Potsdam governorate in 1875, becoming a distinct province-like entity on 1 April 1881). Towards the north west the governorate was bounded by the rivers Elbe and the Havel, and on the north east by the Oder. The south eastern boundary was to the neighbouring governorate of Frankfurt (Oder).

The traditional towns in the governorate were small, however, in the course of the industrial labour migration some reached the rank of urban districts. The principal towns were Brandenburg upon Havel, Köpenick, Potsdam, Prenzlau, Spandau and Ruppin. Until 1875 Berlin also was a town within the governorate. After its disentanglement a number of its suburbs outside Berlin's municipal borders grew to towns, many forming urban Bezirke within the governorate of Potsdam such as Charlottenburg, Lichtenberg, Rixdorf (after 1912 Neukölln), and Schöneberg (all of which, as well as Köpenick and Spandau, incorporated into Greater Berlin in 1920). The urban Bezirke were (years indicating the elevation to rank of urban Bezirkor affiliation with Potsdam governorate, respectively):

20th century
Berlin was the capital of Prussia and later of the German Empire, but the court remained in Potsdam, where many government officials settled. In 1914, Emperor Wilhelm II signed the Declaration of War in the Neues Palais (New Palace). The city lost its status as a "second capital" in 1918, when Wilhelm II abdicated and Germany became a Republic at the end of World War I.

After the Nazis seized power in 1933, there was a ceremonial handshake between President Paul von Hindenburg and the new Chancellor Adolf Hitler on 21 March 1933 in Potsdam's Garrison Church in what became known as the "Day of Potsdam". This symbolised a coalition of the military (Reichswehr) and Nazism. Potsdam was severely damaged by Allied bombing raids during World War II.

The Cecilienhof Palace was the scene of the Potsdam Conference from 17 July to 2 August 1945, at which the victorious Allied leaders Harry S. Truman, Winston Churchill and Joseph Stalin met to decide the future of Germany and postwar Europe in general. The conference ended with the Potsdam Agreement and the Potsdam Declaration.

The government of East Germany (formally known as the German Democratic Republic (German: Deutsche Demokratische Republik, DDR)) tried to remove symbols of "Prussian militarism". Many historic buildings, some of them badly damaged in the war, were demolished.

When in 1946 the remainder of the Province of Brandenburg west of the Oder-Neiße line was constituted as the state of Brandenburg, Potsdam became its capital. In 1952 the GDR disestablished its states and replaced them by smaller new East German administrative districts known as Bezirke. Potsdam became the capital of the new Bezirk Potsdam until 1990.

Potsdam, south-west of Berlin, lay just outside West Berlin after the construction of the Berlin Wall. The walling off of West Berlin not only isolated Potsdam from West Berlin, but also doubled commuting times to East Berlin. The Glienicke Bridge across the Havel connected the city to West Berlin and was the scene of some Cold War exchanges of spies.

After German reunification, Potsdam became the capital of the newly re-established state of Brandenburg. Since then there have been many ideas and efforts to reconstruct the original appearance of the city, including the Potsdam City Palace and the Garrison Church.

Demography
Since 2000 Potsdam has been one of the fastest-growing cities in Germany.

International residents

Largest groups of foreign residents:

Governance

City government
Potsdam has had a mayor (Bürgermeister) and city council since the 15th century. From 1809 the city council was elected, with a mayor (Oberbürgermeister) at its head. During Nazi Germany, the mayor was selected by the NSDAP and the city council was dissolved; it was reconstituted in token form after 1945, but free elections did not take place until after reunification.

Today, the city council is the city's central administrative authority. Local elections took place on 26 October 2003 and again in 2008. Between 1990 and 1999, the Chairman of the City Council was known as the "Town President" but today the post is the "Chairman of the City Council". The mayor is elected directly by the population.

The current mayor is Mike Schubert of the Social Democratic Party (SPD) since 2018. The most recent mayoral election was held on 23 September 2018, with a runoff held on 14 October, and the results were as follows:

! rowspan=2 colspan=2| Candidate
! rowspan=2| Party
! colspan=2| First round
! colspan=2| Second round
|-
! Votes
! %
! Votes
! %
|-
| bgcolor=| 
| align=left| Mike Schubert
| align=left| Social Democratic Party
| 23,872
| 32.2
| 28,803
| 55.3
|-
| bgcolor=| 
| align=left| Martina Trauth
| align=left| The Left
| 14,161
| 19.1
| 23,283
| 44.7
|-
| bgcolor=| 
| align=left| Götz Friederich
| align=left| Christian Democratic Union
| 12,892
| 17.4
|-
| 
| align=left| Lutz Boede
| align=left| The Others
| 8,449
| 11.4
|-
| bgcolor=| 
| align=left| Dennis Hohloch
| align=left| Alternative for Germany
| 8,215
| 11.1
|-
| bgcolor=| 
| align=left| Janny Armbruster
| align=left| Alliance 90/The Greens
| 6,586
| 8.9
|-
! colspan=3| Valid votes
! 74,175
! 99.3
! 52,086
! 97.7
|-
! colspan=3| Invalid votes
! 549
! 0.7
! 1,251
! 2.3
|-
! colspan=3| Total
! 74,724
! 100.0
! 53,337
! 100.0
|-
! colspan=3| Electorate/voter turnout
! 140,963
! 53.0
! 141,109
! 37.8
|-
| colspan=7| Source: City of Potsdam (1st round , 2nd round )
|}

The city council governs the city alongside the mayor. The most recent city council election was held on 26 May 2019, and the results were as follows:

! colspan=2| Party
! Votes
! %
! +/-
! Seats
! +/-
|-
| bgcolor=| 
| align=left| Social Democratic Party (SPD)
| 49,898
| 19.3
|  4.0
| 11
|  2
|-
| bgcolor=| 
| align=left| Alliance 90/The Greens (Grüne)
| 48,739
| 18.8
|  6.9
| 10
|  3
|-
| bgcolor=| 
| align=left| The Left (Die Linke)
| 46,761
| 18.1
|  7.2
| 10
|  4
|-
| bgcolor=| 
| align=left| Christian Democratic Union (CDU)
| 32,078
| 12.4
|  3.1
| 7
|  2
|-
| bgcolor=127070| 
| align=left| The Others (aNDERE)
| 26,754
| 10.3
|  2.6
| 6
|  2
|-
| bgcolor=| 
| align=left| Alternative for Germany (AfD)
| 24,508
| 9.5
|  5.0
| 5
|  2
|-
| bgcolor=| 
| align=left| Free Democratic Party (FDP)
| 12,620
| 4.9
|  2.4
| 3
|  2
|-
| 
| align=left| CitizensAlliance (BB)
| 10,124
| 3.9
|  2.2
| 2
|  1
|-
| bgcolor=| 
| align=left| Die PARTEI
| 3,955
| 1.5
| New
| 0
| New
|-
| bgcolor=| 
| align=left| Brandenburg United Civic Movements/Free Voters (BVB/FW)
| 2,985
| 1.2
|  0.3
| 1
| ±0
|-
| colspan=7 bgcolor=lightgrey| 
|-
| bgcolor=| 
| align=left| Independent Charnow
| 214
| 0.1
| New
| 0
| New
|-
! colspan=2| Total
! 258,636
! 100.0
! 
! 
! 
|-
! colspan=2| Total votes
! 88,055
! 100.0
! 
! 56
! ±0
|-
! colspan=2| Electorate/voter turnout
! 141,443
! 62.3
!  13.5
! 
! 
|-
| colspan=7| Source: City of Potsdam 
|}

Brandenburg state government
The Landtag Brandenburg, the parliament of the state of Brandenburg is in Potsdam. It has been housed in the Potsdam City Palace since 2014.

Twin towns – sister cities

Potsdam is twinned with:

 Opole, Poland (1973)
 Bobigny, France (1974)
 Jyväskylä, Finland (1985)
 Bonn, Germany (1988)
 Perugia, Italy (1990)
 Sioux Falls, United States (1990)
 Lucerne, Switzerland (2002)
 Versailles, France (2016)
 Zanzibar City, Tanzania (2017)
 Ivano-Frankivsk, Ukraine (2023)

Infrastructure

Transport

Rail transport
Potsdam, included in the fare zone "C" (Tarifbereich C) of Berlin's public transport area and fare zones A and B of its own public transport area, is served by the S7 S-Bahn line. The stations served are Griebnitzsee, Babelsberg and the Central Station (Hauptbahnhof), the main and long-distance station of the city. Other DB stations in Potsdam are Charlottenhof, Park Sanssouci (including the monumental Kaiserbahnhof), Medienstadt Babelsberg, Rehbrücke, Pirschheide and Marquardt. The city also possesses a 27 km-long tramway network.

Road transport
Potsdam is served by several motorways: the A 10, a beltway better known as Berliner Ring, the A 115 (using part of the AVUS) and is closely linked to the A 2 and A 9. The B 1 and B 2 federal roads cross the city. Potsdam features a network of urban and suburban buses.

Education and research

Potsdam is a university town. The University of Potsdam was founded in 1991 as a university of the State of Brandenburg. Its predecessor was the Akademie für Staats- und Rechtswissenschaften der DDR "Walter Ulbricht", a college of education founded in 1948 which was one of the GDR's most important colleges. There are about 20,000 students enrolled at the university.

In 1991 the Fachhochschule Potsdam was founded as the second college. It had 3,518 students as of 2017.

Konrad Wolf Film University of Babelsberg (HFF), founded in 1954 in Babelsberg, is the foremost centre of the German film industry since its birth, with over 600 students.

There are also several research foundations, including Fraunhofer Institutes for Applied Polymer Research and Biomedical Engineering, Max Planck Institute for Gravitational Physics (Albert Einstein Institute), Max Planck Institute of Colloids and Interfaces, and Max Planck Institute for Molecular Plant Physiology, the GFZ – German Research Centre for Geosciences, the Potsdam Astrophysical Institute, the Institute for Advanced Sustainability Studies, The Leibniz Institute for Agricultural Engineering and Bioeconomy and the Potsdam Institute for Climate Impact Research, which employs 340 people in researching climate change.

As well as universities, Potsdam is home to reputable secondary schools. Montessori Gesamtschule Potsdam, in western Potsdam, attracts 400 students from the Brandenburg and Berlin region.

Culture

Potsdam was historically a centre of European immigration. Its religious tolerance attracted people from France, Russia, the Netherlands and Bohemia. This is still visible in the culture and architecture of the city.

In 1744 King Frederick the Great ordered the construction of a residence here, where he could live sans souci ("without worries", in the French spoken at the court). The park hosts a botanical garden (Botanical Garden, Potsdam) and many buildings:

 The Sanssouci Palace (Schloss Sanssouci), a relatively modest palace of the Prussian royal (and later German imperial) family
 The Orangery Palace (Orangerieschloss), former palace for foreign royal guests
 The New Palace (Neues Palais), built between 1763 and 1769 to celebrate the end of the Seven Years' War, in which Prussia held off the combined attacks of Austria and Russia. It is a much larger and grander palace than Sanssouci, having over 200 rooms and 400 statues as decoration. It served as a guest house for numerous royal visitors. Today, it houses parts of University of Potsdam.
 The Charlottenhof Palace (Schloss Charlottenhof), a Neoclassical palace by Karl Friedrich Schinkel built in 1826
 The Roman Baths (Römische Bäder), built by Karl Friedrich Schinkel and Friedrich Ludwig Persius in 1829–1840. It is a complex of buildings including a tea pavilion, a Renaissance-style villa, and a Roman bathhouse (from which the whole complex takes its name).
 The Chinese Tea House (Chinesisches Teehaus), an 18th-century pavilion built in a Chinese style, the fashion of the time.

Three gates from the original city wall remain today. The oldest is the Hunters' Gate (Jägertor), built in 1733. The Nauener Tor was built in 1755 and close to the historic Dutch Quarter. The ornate Brandenburg Gate (built in 1770, not to be confused with the Brandenburg Gate in Berlin) is situated on the Luisenplatz at the western entrance to the old town.

The Old Market Square (Alter Markt) is Potsdam's historical city centre. For three centuries this was the site of the City Palace (Stadtschloß), a royal palace built in 1662. Under Frederick the Great, the palace became the winter residence of the Prussian kings. The palace was severely damaged by Allied bombing in 1945 and demolished in 1961 by the Communist authorities. In 2002 the Fortuna Gate (Fortunaportal) was rebuilt in its original historic position which was followed by a complete reconstruction of the palace as the Brandenburg Landtag building inaugurated in 2014. Nearby the square in the Humboldtstraße block, which also was demolished after getting damaged in 1945, reconstructions of several representative residential palaces including Palazzo Pompei and Palazzo Barberini housing an arts museum were completed in 2016–2017 alongside buildings with modernized facades to restore the historical proportions of the block.

The Old Market Square is dominated today by the dome of St. Nicholas' Church, built in 1837 in the Neoclassical style. It was the last work of Karl Friedrich Schinkel, who designed the building but did not live to see its completion. It was finished by his disciples Friedrich August Stüler and Ludwig Persius. The eastern side of the Market Square is dominated by the Old City Hall, built in 1755 by the Dutch architect Jan Bouman (1706–1776). It has a characteristic circular tower, crowned with a gilded Atlas bearing the world on his shoulders.

North of the Old Market Square is the oval French Church (Französische Kirche), erected in the 1750s by Boumann for the Huguenot community. To the south lies the Museum Barberini, a copy of the previous building, the Barberini Palace. The museum was funded by the German billionaire Hasso Plattner. The former Baroque building was built by Carl von Gontard in 1771–1772, inspired by the Renaissance palace Palazzo Barberini in Rome. The newly built museum was scheduled to open in spring 2017.

Another landmark of Potsdam is the two-street Dutch Quarter (Holländisches Viertel), an ensemble of buildings that is unique in Europe, with about 150 houses built of red bricks in the Dutch style. It was built between 1734 and 1742 under the direction of Jan Bouman to be used by Dutch artisans and craftsmen who had been invited to settle here by King Frederick Wilhelm I. Today, this area is one of Potsdam's most visited quarters.

North of the city centre is the Russian colony of Alexandrowka, a small enclave of Russian architecture (including an Orthodox chapel) built in 1825 for a group of Russian immigrants. Since 1999, the colony has been part of the UNESCO World Heritage Site Palaces and Parks of Potsdam and Berlin.

East of the Alexandrowka colony is a large park, the New Garden (Neuer Garten), which was laid out from 1786 in the English style. The site contains two palaces; one of them, the Cecilienhof, was where the Potsdam Conference was held in July and August 1945. The Marmorpalais (Marble Palace) was built in 1789 in Neoclassical style. Nearby is the Biosphäre Potsdam, a tropical botanical garden.

Babelsberg, a quarter south-east of the centre, houses the UFA film studios (Babelsberg Studios), and an extensive park with some historical buildings, including the Babelsberg Palace (Schloß Babelsberg, a Gothic revival palace designed by Schinkel).

The Einstein Tower is located within the Albert Einstein Science Park, which is on the top of the Telegraphenberg within an astronomy compound.

Potsdam also features a memorial centre in the former KGB prison in Leistikowstraße. In the Volkspark to the north, there is one of the last monuments dedicated to Lenin in Germany.

Potsdam joined UNESCO's Network of Creative Cities as a Design City on October 31, 2019 on the occasion of World Cities’ Day.

Parks
There are many parks in Potsdam, most of them UNESCO World Heritage Sites. Among their attractions are:

Sports
 1. FFC Turbine Potsdam, one of the most successful German female football clubs (Bundesliga (women))
 Potsdam Royals, American football team competing in the German Football League.
 SV Babelsberg 03, football club Regionalliga Nordost
 
 USV Potsdam, rugby union (2nd Rugby-Bundesliga) and football (Kreisklasse)
 List of football clubs in Potsdam
 The  (Potsdam Palace Marathon) is a marathon in that is held annually in June. Thousands of runners run the course past the palaces for the half marathon and several hundred repeat the course to complete the full marathon.

Notable people

18th century

Abraham Abramson (1754–1811), medalist
Ludwig Yorck von Wartenburg (1759–1830), Prussian field marshal
Wilhelm von Humboldt (1767–1835), scholar and statesman, founder of the Berlin Humboldt University
Frederick William III of Prussia (1770–1840), King of Prussia 1797–1840
Wilhelm Ludwig Viktor Henckel von Donnersmarck (1775–1849), Prussian general lieutenant
Eleonore Prochaska (1785–1813), woman soldier during the liberation war, unrecognized as a man disguised as a drummer, later as an infantryman in the Prussian army against Napoleon
Friedrich Wilhelm von Rauch (1790–1850), lieutenant general in the Prussian Army
Heinrich Wilhelm Krausnick (1797–1882), lawyer and Lord Mayor of Berlin

19th century

Moritz Hermann von Jacobi (1801–1874), physicist and engineer
Ludwig Persius (1803–1845), architect
Carl Gustav Jacob Jacobi (1804–1851), mathematician
Adolf von Rauch (1805–1877), Prussian cavalry officer 
Philipp Galen (1813–1899), writer and physician
Julius Lange (1815–1905), numismatist
Hermann von Helmholtz (1821–1894), physiologist and physicist, one of the most important natural scientists of his time
Alfred Bonaventura von Rauch (1824–1900), Prussian general
Friedrich Wilhelm von Rauch (1827–1907), Prussian general leutnant
Egmont von Rauch (1829–1875), Prussian cavalry officer and later colonel in the Prussian Army
Frederick III, German Emperor (1831–1888), Emperor of the German Empire and King of Prussia 1888
Alfred von Waldersee (1832–1904), field marshal
Ernst Haeckel (1834–1919), zoologist, philosopher
Gottlieb Graf von Haeseler (1836–1919), Prussian field marshal
Hermann Schubert (1848–1911), mathematician
Wilhelm II, German Emperor (1859–1941), Emperor of the German Empire and King of Prussia 1888–1918
Friedrich Adolf Steinhausen (1859−1910), doctor and physiologist
Friedrich Wilhelm von Rauch (1868–1899), Prussian officer
Friedrich Ludwig (1872–1930), music historian and rector of the University of Göttingen
Friedrich Wilhelm von Bissing (1873–1956), egyptologist
Elisabeth von Knobelsdorff (1877–1959), engineer and architect
Prince Eitel Friedrich of Prussia (1883–1942), second son of King William II of Prussia
Ludowika Jakobsson (1884–1968), German-Finnish figure skater
Leo Geyr von Schweppenburg (1886–1974), general of tank troops and military attachée
Luise Schulze-Berghof (1889-1970), German composer and pianist
Hans-Karl Freiherr von Esebeck (1892-1955), general
Paul Blobel (1894–1951), Nazi war criminal, hanged for war crimes
Hasso von Manteuffel (1897-1978) General in the Wehrmacht, and later spokesman for defense of the Free Democratic Party in the Bundestag

20th century

Margarete Buber-Neumann (1901–1989), writer
Egon Eiermann (1904–1970), architect
Louis Ferdinand of Prussia (1907–1994), German and Prussian heir to the throne and head of the House of Hohenzollern
Marie Eleonore of Albania (1909–1957), princess
Adam von Trott zu Solz (1909–1944), lawyer, diplomat and resistance fighter
Carol Victor (1913–1973), Hereditary Prince of Albania
Peter Weiss (1916–1982), writer, graphic artist and painter
Hans Richter (1919–2008), actor
Bernhard Hassenstein (1922–2016), biologist and behaviorist
Burkhard Heim (1925–2001), theoretical physicist
Günther Schramm (born 1929), actor
Hilla Becher (1934–2015), photographer
Nicole Heesters (born 1937), actress
Manfred Wolke (born 1943), boxer and boxing coach
Klaus Katzur (1943–2016), swimmer and Olympic medalist
Wolfgang Joop (born 1944), fashion designer
Oliver Bendt (born 1946), actor, gymnast, singer 
Christiane Lanzke (born 1947), diver and actress
Lothar Doering (born 1950), handball player and coach
Brigitte Ahrenholz (born 1952), rower
Matthias Platzeck (born 1953), politician, Minister President of Brandenburg
Klaus Thiele (born 1958), athlete
Gabriele Berg (born 1963), biologist and biotechnologist
Ralf Brudel (born 1963), rower 
Jens-Peter Berndt (born 1963), swimmer
Birgit Peter (born 1964), rower
Carsten Wolf (born 1964), cyclist, world champion
Daniela Neunast (born 1966), steward in rowing
René Monse (born 1968), heavyweight boxer
Klara Geywitz (born 1976), politician
Aleksandr Sayenko (born 1978), footballer

20th century

Ermyas Mulugeta, assaulted in a nationally significant case

Honorary citizens
 1845: Wilhelm Ludwig Viktor Henckel von Donnersmarck, Lieutenant General
 1856: Friedrich von Wrangel, Field Marshal
 1863: Peter Joseph Lenné, gardener and landscape architect
 1891: Hermann von Helmholtz, naturalist
 1905: Theobald von Bethmann Hollweg, president of the province of Brandenburg
 1933: Paul von Hindenburg, Fieldmarshal and Reichspräsident
 1933: Adolf Hitler, chancellor (withdrawn 15 August 1990 by decision of the Potsdam City Council)
 1938: Josef Goebbels, Minister of Propaganda
 1955: Max Volmer, physical chemist
 1960: Hans Marchwitza, writer and proletarian poet
 1965: Otto Nagel, painter

See also

Mostar Friedensprojekt

References

Sources
 Paul Sigel, Silke Dähmlow, Frank Seehausen und Lucas Elmenhorst, Architekturführer Potsdam Architectural Guide, Dietrich Reimer Verlag, Berlin 2006, .

External links

  and English
Extensive photoarchive about Potsdam

 
Cities in Brandenburg
German state capitals
Populated places established in the 7th century
7th-century establishments in Germany